In Vivo is an extended play (EP) musical recording by Loco Locass. The album, released in 2003, includes 6 tracks. The CD-ROM version of the recording includes 12 audio files and 6 video files. The genre of the music is rap  and the language is (Canadian) French.

Track listing

CD-ROM content
Audio Files
"ROC rap"
"Super Mario"
"Manifestif (Live)"
"Art politik (Live)"
"Langage-toi (Live)"
"Boom Baby Boom!" (Live)"
"Priapée la p'tite vite (a cappella) (Live)"
"Art poétik (Live)"
"Yallah (Live)"
"Sheila Djom (Live)"
"Le grand Rio (Live)"
"Soupe du jour"
Video Files
"ROC rap"
"Super Mario"
"Sheila, ch'us là (Live)"
"Manifestif (Live)"
"Langage-toi (Live)"
"Le grand Rio (Interactive Music Video)"

Loco Locass albums
2003 EPs